Dr. Sake Sailajanath is an Indian politician from Andhra Pradesh, India and Andhra Pradesh Congress Committee president. He was a former minister of Andhra Pradesh.

References 

Indian National Congress politicians from Andhra Pradesh
1964 births
Living people